Lucas George Tomlinson (born 6 November 2000) is an English professional footballer who plays as a midfielder for Yate Town.

Early and personal life
Tomlinson was born in Bristol. He attended Easton CE(VA) Primary School, now Easton CE Academy.

Club career

Bristol Rovers
Having joined their academy at the age of 10, Tomlinson signed a professional contract with Bristol Rovers in the summer of 2019. Tomlinson made his debut for Rovers on 24 September 2019 as a substitute in a 2–1 EFL Trophy victory over Chelsea Under-21s. He made his league debut on 14 December 2019, coming on as a second-half substitute for Tom Nichols in a 2–1 victory at Ipswich Town. He signed a new contract with Bristol Rovers in June 2020. On 2 June 2021, Tomlinson signed a new one-year contract with the League Two side. Tomlinson was released at the end of the 2021–22 season.

Bath City (loan)
On 13 October 2020, Tomlinson joined National League South side Bath City on loan until 2 January 2021 and made his debut later that day in the FA Cup as Bath defeated Slough Town 1–0.

Torquay United (loan)
On 24 April 2021, Tomlinson joined National League side Torquay United on loan for the remainder of the season, as Torquay pushed for promotion. He made his debut later that day as a 56' minute substitute as Torquay came from 2–0 down against Notts County to draw 2–2 in the 98th minute of the match and move to the top of the league.

Gloucester City
On 1 October 2021, Tomlinson joined Gloucester City on a youth loan deal. His move to the National League North side would see him managed by former-Rovers youth-team boss Lee Mansell. He made his debut the following day as his side were on the wrong-end of an FA Cup upset as they lost 1–0 at Isthmian Premier Division side Folkestone Invicta. On 12 November, his loan was extended until January 2022. On 4 January 2022, the loan was again extended, this time until the end of the 2021–22 season. On 19 February 2022, Tomlinson scored the first senior goal of his career in a 2–2 draw with Darlington. Tomlinson's goalscoring form continued and he was awarded Gloucester City's Player of the Month award for March. Tomlinson ended the season having won the Gloucester City Young Player of the Season award.

On 29 July 2022, Tomlinson returned to Gloucester City on a permanent basis following his release from Bristol Rovers. On 11 November 2022, Tomlinson departed the club by mutual consent.

Salisbury
Following his departure from Gloucester City, Tomlinson joined Southern Football League Premier Division South club Salisbury.

Yate Town
In March 2023, Tomlinson signed for Yate Town.

Career statistics

Honours
Individual
Gloucester City Young Player of the Year: 2021–22

References

External links
 
 
 

2001 births
Living people
Footballers from Bristol
English footballers
Association football midfielders
Bristol Rovers F.C. players
Bath City F.C. players
Torquay United F.C. players
Gloucester City A.F.C. players
Salisbury F.C. players
Yate Town F.C. players
English Football League players
National League (English football) players
Southern Football League players